Woodville Gray (10 June 1866 – 28 February 1938) was a Scottish footballer who played as a forward.

Career
A member of a large and successful Quaker family who manufactured biscuits (Gray Dunn & Co), Gray played club football for Glasgow Academy, Pollokshields Athletic and Queen's Park (his handful of appearances as a 'guest player' including a Glasgow Merchants Charity Cup victory and an appearance on the losing side in the 1885 FA Cup Final).

He made one appearance for Scotland in 1886; he had first been called up in 1883, which would have made him the youngest player in the nation's history – but he had to decline the invitation.

Among his siblings was the physician Albert Alexander Gray.

References

1866 births
1938 deaths
Scottish footballers
Scotland international footballers
Queen's Park F.C. players
Pollokshields Athletic F.C. players
People from Govan
Association football forwards
FA Cup Final players
People educated at the Glasgow Academy
People educated at Bootham School